Odontosida magnificum is a moth of the family Sphingidae. It is known from South Africa and Zimbabwe.

The forewing upperside is similar to Neogurelca hyas, but with a conspicuous dark brown triangular patch surrounding a small, oval, white discal spot. The forewing underside is basally yellow to orange. The hindwing upperside is basally yellow, orange-brown distally. The tornal area is black.

References

Macroglossini
Lepidoptera of Mozambique
Lepidoptera of South Africa
Lepidoptera of Zimbabwe
Moths of Sub-Saharan Africa
Moths described in 1894